Nogometni klub Aluminij, commonly referred to as NK Aluminij or simply Aluminij, is a Slovenian football club from Kidričevo, playing in the Slovenian Second League. The club was founded in 1946.

Honours
Yugoslavia
Slovenian Republic League
 Winners: 1965–66

Slovenian Republic Cup
 Winners: 1965

Slovenia

Slovenian Second League
 Winners: 2010–11, 2011–12
 Runners-up: 2008–09, 2014–15, 2015–16

Slovenian Third League (East)
 Winners: 1996–97
 Runners-up: 1993–94

Slovenian Football Cup
 Runners-up: 2001–02, 2017–18

MNZ Ptuj Cup
 Winners: 1991–92, 1993, 1994–95, 1999–2000, 2000–01, 2001–02, 2002–03, 2004–05, 2008–09, 2009–10, 2013–14

Domestic league and cup results

References

External links
Official website 
PrvaLiga profile 
Soccerway profile

Association football clubs established in 1946
Football clubs in Slovenia
Football clubs in Yugoslavia
1946 establishments in Slovenia